Hulford is a surname. Notable people with the surname include:
James Hulford (1878-1963), Chemist
Frederick Hulford (1883–1976), British middle distance runner
Steve Hulford (born 1949), British Historian (Essex Witch Trials)
Paul Hulford (born 1958), Property Investor and Wealth Educator (Learn To Be Wealthy)
Justin Hulford (born 1971), British writer
Steve Hulford (born 1971), Canadian Entrepreneur